The Erinle River is a river in Osun State, Nigeria, a right tributary of the Osun River, which it enters from the north near Ede just below the Ede Dam.
Another reservoir, the new Erinle Dam, lies higher up the river.
Water from the two dams supplies Osogbo, the state capital. 
There are significant health issues with the untreated and treated water.

Name

In the Yoruba tradition, Erinle was a great hunter who became an orisha. He is said to have conducted the first Olobu of Ilobu to the site of the town of Ilobu, and to have protected the people of the town from Fulani invasions.
He is usually described as a hunter but sometimes as a herbalist or a farmer. It is said that one day he sank into the earth near Ilobu and became a river.
He is known all over Yorùbáland.
The cult of Erinle is found in towns throughout the former Oyo Empire.
His shrines contain smooth, round stones from the Erinle River. 
The name may be derived from erin (elephant) and ilẹ (earth), or from erin and ile (house).

Course

The Erinle River rises just south of Offa.
The Erinle River has residential, commercial and industrial areas on both sides, which as of 2012 released untreated waste into the river. It was also polluted by excess fertilizers and pesticides from farmland.
The old and new dams on the river supply water to Osogbo, the state capital, which also uses boreholes and wells to obtain water.
Malaria and diarrhea are rampant in Osogbo, particularly in the high-density residential areas where the people depend on public tap water.

Dams

It is located in Ede town.
Tests in June and July 2011 showed that treated water from the dam had a high presence of total coliform and was not suitable for drinking without further treatment.
Bacteria in the treated water were also highly resistant to commonly used antibiotics in Nigeria.

The new Erinle Dam in the Olorunda LGA lies upstream from the old Ede Dam on the Erinle River.
It is owned and operated by the Osun State Water Corporation.
The Otin River enters the dam from the left.
The dam is used for water supply, flood control and fishing.
Schistosomiasis, both urinary and intestinal, was reported downstream from the dam in 1991. A study in 2000–01 found that the prevalence of the host snails and of human infection had increased significantly since then.

References

Sources

 
 
 
 
 
 

Rivers of Nigeria
Osun State
Rivers of Yorubaland